Patryk Tuszyński (born 13 December 1989) is a Polish professional footballer who plays as a striker for Chojniczanka Chojnice.

Career
Tuszyński started his football career in Marcinki Kępno, from where he moved to Gawin Królewska Wola. On 11 August 2020, Tuszyński joined Wisła Płock, signing a 2–year contract.

International career
Tuszyński got his first call up to the senior Poland squad for friendlies against Georgia and Greece in June 2015.

References

External links
 
 

1989 births
People from Syców
Sportspeople from Lower Silesian Voivodeship
Living people
Polish footballers
MKS Kluczbork players
Lechia Gdańsk players
Sandecja Nowy Sącz players
Jagiellonia Białystok players
Çaykur Rizespor footballers
Zagłębie Lubin players
Piast Gliwice players
Wisła Płock players
Chojniczanka Chojnice players
Ekstraklasa players
I liga players
II liga players
III liga players
Süper Lig players
Expatriate footballers in Turkey
Polish expatriate sportspeople in Turkey
Association football forwards